Kevin Taylor (1 August 1947 – March 2020) was an English professional rugby league footballer who played in the 1960s, 1970s and 1980s.

Background
Taylor was born in Oldham, Lancashire, England, and he died aged  in Garden Suburb, Oldham, Greater Manchester, England.

Playing career

International honours
Taylor won a cap for England while at Oldham he played  and scored a try in England's 17–24 defeat by Wales at The Willows, Salford on Thursday 7 November 1968.

County honours
Taylor won a cap(s) for Lancashire while at Oldham.

County Cup Final appearances
Taylor played  in Oldham's 13-16 defeat by Wigan in the 1966 Lancashire County Cup Final during the 1966–67 season at Station Road, Swinton on Saturday 29 October 1966, and played  in the 2-30 defeat by St. Helens in the 1968 Lancashire County Cup Final during the 1968–69 season at Central Park, Wigan on Friday 25 October 1968.

Honoured at Oldham
Taylor is an Oldham Hall Of Fame Inductee.

References

External links
Profile at www.orl-heritagetrust.org.uk
Statistics at orl-heritagetrust.org.uk

1947 births
2020 deaths
England national rugby league team players
English rugby league players
Lancashire rugby league team players
Leigh Leopards captains
Leigh Leopards players
Oldham R.L.F.C. players
Rugby league hookers
Rugby league players from Oldham
St Helens R.F.C. players